Joseph Majcher (born March 17, 1960) is a Polish-born Canadian former soccer player who played at both professional and international levels as a midfielder.

Club career
Majcher played in the Canadian Soccer League with the Toronto Blizzard and the North York Rockets. In 1993, he played in the Canadian National Soccer League with Toronto Rockets. In 1994, he played with the Toronto Rockets in the American Professional Soccer League.

International career
Majcher, who moved to Canada in 1985, earned three caps for Canada between 1991 and 1992, including one appearance at the 1991 CONCACAF Gold Cup.

Managerial career  
Majcher was the head coach for Wisla United in the Ontario Soccer League, where he was named the Head Coach of the Year in 2006 in the OSL Provincial division.

References

1960 births
Living people
Association football midfielders
Canadian soccer coaches
Canadian soccer players
Canada men's international soccer players
1991 CONCACAF Gold Cup players
Toronto Blizzard (1986–1993) players
North York Rockets players
Toronto Rockets players
Canadian Soccer League (1987–1992) players
Canadian National Soccer League players 
American Professional Soccer League players
People from Rzeszów
Sportspeople from Podkarpackie Voivodeship
Polish footballers
Polish emigrants to Canada